Gornji Grad–Medveščak is one of the districts of Zagreb, Croatia; Gornji Grad translates as "Upper Town", referring to its historical location on city's hillside, being above Donji Grad ("Lower Town").

Gornji Grad–Medveščak is a district with a high number of historic sites and tourist attractions. Gradec and Kaptol, the two distinct cores of medieval Zagreb, are forming today's Upper Town, and both are parts of this district. The city's Cathedral, the St. Mark's Church and the Croatian Parliament are located in Gornji Grad, as is the popular pedestrian café street Tkalčićeva. There are also other noteworthy objects located outside the oldest historical towns, such as city's monumental cemetery Mirogoj that was built since 1876, located further north.

It is bordered by four other districts: Donji Grad to the south, Črnomerec to the west, Maksimir to the east and Podsljeme to the north.

Streets and transport
The most important arterial road in Gornji Grad–Medveščak flows between its southern and northern border, starting as a narrow Ribnjak street alongside the Ribnjak park, then widening and changing name to Medveščak street until Gupčeva zvijezda, and again changing name in the north to Ksaver. The road is the main tram connection for Medveščak (lines 8 and 14). The district is also connected in its southern borders by many other important tram lines that run along Ilica, Jurišićeva and Vlaška streets. The short historic Zagreb funicular connects Lower and Upper town, and several less frequent (every 20–45 minutes) bus routes run through the hilly and less populated northern areas.

Government
Belonging to the districts with a population between 30,000 and 50,000, Gornji Grad – Medveščak is governed by a council consisting of 15 councilmen appointed at the 2017 local elections.

List of neighborhoods in Gornji Grad–Medveščak 
Gornji grad
Gupčeva zvijezda
Kaptol
Kraljevec
Ksaver
Medveščak
Mirogoj
Nova Ves
Pantovčak
Petrova
Ribnjak
Šalata
Tkalčićeva Street
Tuškanac
Voćarska
Zelengaj

See also 
 History of Zagreb

References

External links

 Zagreb Gornji Grad photos

 
Districts of Zagreb